Orestis (Greek: Ορέστης) was a region of Upper Macedonia, corresponding roughly to the modern Kastoria regional unit located in West Macedonia, Greece. Its inhabitants were the Orestae, an ancient Greek tribe that was part of the Molossian tribal state or koinon.

Etymology
The term Orestis is derived from the Greek word orestias meaning "of the mountains" or "mountainous".

History

Like most of Upper Macedonia, Orestis only became part of Macedon after the early 4th century BC; before that, it had close relations with Epirus. A 6th century BC silver finger ring bearing the frequent Orestian name "Antiochus" was found in the Dodona sanctuary. During the Peloponnesian War, a thousand Orestians led by King Antiochus accompanied the Parauaeans of Epirus. Hecataeus and Strabo identified these mountain kingdoms as being of Epirotic stock. Natives of the region were: Pausanias of Orestis, the lover and murderer of Philip II, and three of Alexander's prominent diadochi: Perdiccas (son of Orontes), Seleucus I Nicator (son of Antiochus) and his uncle Ptolemy, and Craterus and Amphoterus, sons of a noble from Orestis named Alexander.

The region became independent again in 196 BC, when the Romans, after defeating Philip V (r. 221–179 BC), declared the Orestae free because they had supported the Roman cause in the recent war against Macedon. According to Appian, Argos Orestikon (in modern Orestida), rather than Peloponnesian Argos, was the homeland of the Argead dynasty. According to Miltiades Hatzopoulos, the ancient Macedonians wandered from Orestis to Lower Macedonia where they founded the ancient Greek kingdom of Macedon.

See also
Battyna
Parauaea
Tymphaea

References

Citations

Sources

Further reading
Polybius. The Histories, 18.47.6.

 
Geography of ancient Macedonia
Kingdoms in Greek Antiquity
 
Second Macedonian War
Upper Macedonia